Fallen Angel is an extended play by American hardcore punk band 25 ta Life, released on May 23, 2006. It is also available on blue vinyl 12", which was limited to 500 copies. This record was dedicated to Achilleas "Archie" Kalafatis. SIB stands for Strong Island Boys.

Track listing

 Fallen Angel, RIP, Archie, SIB
 I'm Your Enemy, Fuck You
 Prepare Yourself to Lose, Heroin Demon
 Those Days I'll Never Forget, Hardcore Legacy
 Underdogs Will Rise
 We Got the Spirit, Hardcore Pride
 Invisible Minority (Jetsex cover)

Credits
Rick Healey - vocals
Ezra van Buskirk - guitars
Chumley - bass
Justin the Jew - drums

2006 EPs
25 ta Life albums